McCallin is a surname. Notable people with the surname include:

Andy McCallin, Irish hurler and Gaelic footballer
Clement McCallin (1913–1977), English actor
Lois McCallin (born 1958), American aviator
Shona McCallin (born 1992), English field hockey player
William McCallin (1842–1904), American mayor